Mason Wilby (born 18 November 1999) is an English international swimmer. He has represented England at the Commonwealth Games.

Biography
Wilby is the son of Martyn Wilby, the former coach of Gemma Spofforth and the Canadian Olympic team. Consequently Mason Wilby grew up in the United States. He was educated at the University of Kentucky and holds dual citizenship. In 2017, at the Commonwealth Youth Games he won the  200 metres butterfly gold medal. Wilby won the silver medal behind James Guy in the 200 metres butterfly at the 2022 British Swimming Championships.

In 2022, he was selected for the 2022 Commonwealth Games in Birmingham where he competed in the men's 200 metres butterfly, reaching the final and finishing in 6th place.

References

1999 births
Living people
English male swimmers
British male swimmers
Swimmers at the 2022 Commonwealth Games
Commonwealth Games competitors for England
20th-century English people
21st-century English people